Park Tae-jun (born 19 January 1999) is a South Korean footballer who plays as midfielder for Seoul E-Land FC of K League 2.

Career
Park joined K League 2 side Seongnam FC before 2018 season starts.

Career statistics

Club

Honours

International

South Korea U20
FIFA U-20 World Cup runner-up: 2019

References

1999 births
Living people
Association football midfielders
South Korean footballers
K League 1 players
K League 2 players
Seongnam FC players
FC Anyang players
Seoul E-Land FC players
South Korea under-20 international footballers